Goodedulla is a national park in Queensland, Australia,  northwest of Brisbane. The park is located in the centre of the Brigalow Belt.

Access to the park is by four-wheel-drive vehicle only. Camping requires a permit and is available at three locations; Wadlow Yards, Kings Dam and The Palms, although none of the three have any facilities.

The average elevation of the terrain is 147 meters. 399 species of wild animals have been recorded in the park.

See also

 Protected areas of Queensland

References

National parks of Central Queensland
Protected areas established in 1994